Cesa is a town in Italy.

Cesa or CESA may also refer to:

 Cesa (butterfly), a butterfly genus of the family Lycaenidae 
 Cesa (surname), an Italian surname

CESA 

California Endangered Species Act
Coverdell Education Savings Account
Church of England in South Africa
Computer Entertainment Supplier's Association.
Cryptographic Engine and Security Accelerator like for example TrustZone (Security Extensions) as part of the ARM architecture
Controlled emergency swimming ascent, an emergency ascent technique for scuba divers
Cyberspace Electronic Security Act
CESA Awards